The Journal of Experimental and Theoretical Physics (JETP) [ (ЖЭТФ), or Zhurnal Éksperimental'noĭ i Teoreticheskoĭ Fiziki (ZhÉTF)] is a peer-reviewed Russian bilingual scientific journal covering all areas of experimental and theoretical physics. For example, coverage includes solid state physics, elementary particles, and cosmology. The journal is published simultaneously in both Russian and English languages. 
The editor-in-chief is Alexander F. Andreev. In addition, this journal is a continuation of Soviet physics, JETP (1931–1992), which began English translation in 1955.

Indexing
JETP is indexed in:

References

External links
 J. Exp. Theor. Phys. website (jetp.ras.ru) 
 J. Exp. Theor. Phys. website (Maik)
 J. Exp. Theor. Phys. website (Springer)

Physics journals
Russian-language journals
English-language journals
Monthly journals
Nauka academic journals
Russian Academy of Sciences academic journals